The 2018 Gent–Wevelgem was a road cycling one-day race that took place on 25 March 2018 in Belgium. It was the 80th edition of Gent–Wevelgem and the eleventh event of the 2018 UCI World Tour.

Teams
As Gent–Wevelgem was a UCI World Tour event, all eighteen UCI WorldTeams were invited automatically and obliged to enter a team in the race. Seven UCI Professional Continental teams competed, completing the 25-team peloton.

Result

References

External links

2018 UCI World Tour
2018 in Belgian sport
2018
March 2018 sports events in Belgium